Green Pastures may refer to:

 The Green Pastures, a 1930 play by Marc Connelly 
 The Green Pastures (film), a 1936 film adaptation by Mark Connelly
 The Green Pastures (Hallmark Hall of Fame), a 1957 telefilm adaptation
 Green Pastures (Sandwich, New Hampshire), a historic summer estate
 Green Pastures (Austin, Texas), a historic Victorian home built in 1895
 Green Pastures (Middleburg, Virginia), a historic home designed by Penrose Stout
 Green Pastures Hospital, a hospital in Pokhara, Nepal